KAPT may refer to:

 KAPT-LP, a defunct low-power television station (channel 29) formerly licensed to serve Alamogordo, New Mexico, United States
 Marion County Airport (Tennessee) (ICAO code KAPT)